Ira is a town in Cayuga County, New York, United States. The population was 2,145 at the 2020 census. The town is in the northern part of the county and is northwest of Syracuse.

History 

Ira was part of the Central New York Military Tract. The first settlers arrived circa 1800. The town was founded in 1821 from part of the town of Cato. Part of Ira was returned to Cato in 1824.

Geography
Many drumlins, relics of the Ice Age, are scattered about the town.

The northern town line and part of the eastern town boundary are the border of Oswego County, and the remainder of the east town line is the border of Onondaga County.

New York State Route 34 and New York State Route 176 are north–south highways in Ira. New York State Route 370 is an east–west highway along the south town line.

Demographics

As of the census of 2000, there were 2,426 people, 822 households, and 669 families residing in the town.  The population density was 69.6 people per square mile (26.9/km2).  There were 867 housing units at an average density of 24.9 per square mile (9.6/km2).  The racial makeup of the town was 97.03% White, 0.41% African American, 0.70% Native American, 0.04% Asian, 0.04% Pacific Islander, and 1.77% from two or more races. Hispanic or Latino of any race were 1.03% of the population.

There were 822 households, out of which 41.4% had children under the age of 18 living with them, 65.5% were married couples living together, 10.7% had a female householder with no husband present, and 18.5% were non-families. 14.1% of all households were made up of individuals, and 4.1% had someone living alone who was 65 years of age or older.  The average household size was 2.95 and the average family size was 3.20.

In the town, the population was spread out, with 30.6% under the age of 18, 7.1% from 18 to 24, 31.7% from 25 to 44, 22.0% from 45 to 64, and 8.5% who were 65 years of age or older.  The median age was 35 years. For every 100 females, there were 100.8 males.  For every 100 females age 18 and over, there were 100.1 males.

The median income for a household in the town was $46,027, and the median income for a family was $48,750. Males had a median income of $35,472 versus $25,134 for females. The per capita income for the town was $16,954.  About 3.4% of families and 7.0% of the population were below the poverty line, including 9.0% of those under age 18 and 5.3% of those age 65 or over.

Communities and locations in Ira 
Beaver Meadows – A swampy area south of Benton Corners.
Benton Corners – A location east of Ira village on NY-176.
Bethel Corners (also called "Bethel") – A Hamlet near the northern town line on NY-34.
Cato – The village of Cato is on the southern town boundary, partly in the town of Cato.
Floridaville – A hamlet at the eastern town line.
Fox's Corners – A former location west of Ira village.
Ira (formerly "Ira Center") – The hamlet of Ira is near the center of the town. It was settled circa 1805.
Ira Corners (formerly "Ira Station") – a location on the western town line, west of Ira.
Meridian – The village of Meridian is by the southern town line in the town of Cato.
Mud Pond – A small lake in the southwestern part of Ira.

References

External links
Town of Ira official website
History of Ira, New York

Towns in Cayuga County, New York